Chociszew may refer to the following places:
Chociszew, Sieradz County in Łódź Voivodeship (central Poland)
Chociszew, Tomaszów Mazowiecki County in Łódź Voivodeship (central Poland)
Chociszew, Zgierz County in Łódź Voivodeship (central Poland)